Leah Rush (born October 25, 1984) is a former American professional basketball player who played one season in the WNBA for the Chicago Sky. She played college basketball at Oklahoma.

College career
Rush signed to play for Oklahoma on November 15, 2002.

During her time at Oklahoma, Rush was a solid contributor. She "set the tone" as head coach Sherri Cole stated about how Rush's impact was felt when she was on the court. For the 2005–2006 season, Rush was tapped as a Preseason All-Big 12 performer. In the 2006 Big 12 Championship Game, Rush scored 12 points to help Oklahoma complete and undefeated Big 12 season and capture its 3rd title in 5 years. Rush earned herself a Big 12 Honorable Mention selection in her senior season.

College statistics

Professional career
Rush was selected in the 3rd Round, 28th Overall, in the 2007 WNBA Draft by the Phoenix Mercury. She was waived from the Mercury prior to the start of the season and did not make the team.

Chicago Sky
During the 2008 WNBA season, Rush was signed by the Chicago Sky to multiple 7-Day Contracts, thus officially making a WNBA roster. Rush appeared in 2 games for the Sky.

WNBA career statistics

Regular season

|-
| align="left" | 2008
| align="left" | Chicago
| 2 || 0 || 6.0 || .000 || .000 || .750 || 0.0 || 0.0 || 0.0 || 0.0 || 1.0 || 1.5
|-
| align="left" | Career
| align="left" | 1 year, 1 team
| 2 || 0 || 6.0 || .000 || .000 || .750 || 0.0 || 0.0 || 0.0 || 0.0 || 1.0 || 1.5

References

External links
WNBA bio

1984 births
Living people
American women's basketball players
Basketball players from Texas
Forwards (basketball)
Oklahoma Sooners women's basketball players
Chicago Sky players